Crambus dianiphalis is a species of moth of the family Crambidae. It is found in Sri Lanka.

This species has a wingspan of 28mm.

References

External links

Crambini
Moths of Asia
Moths described in 1908